, also known as Hide, is a Japanese footballer currently playing as a midfielder for Nagoya Grampus.

Career statistics

Club
.

Notes

References

2003 births
Living people
People from Yokkaichi
Association football people from Mie Prefecture
Japanese footballers
Japan youth international footballers
Association football midfielders
Nagoya Grampus players
21st-century Japanese people